The 1991 Croatian Lottery Cup, also known as the Croatian Lottery Cup – Bol Ladies Open was a women's tennis tournament played on outdoor clay courts in Bol, Yugoslavia that was part of Tier V of the 1991 WTA Tour. It was the inaugural edition of the tournament and was held from 22 April through 28 April 1991. Second-seeded Sandra Cecchini won the singles title.

Finals

Singles
 Sandra Cecchini defeated  Magdalena Maleeva 6–4, 3–6, 7–5
 It was Cecchini's only singles title of the year and the 11th of her career.

Doubles
 Laura Golarsa /  Magdalena Maleeva defeated  Sandra Cecchini /  Laura Garrone 6–3, 1–6, 6–4
 It was Golarsa's only doubles title of the year and the 2nd of her career. It was Maleeva's only doubles title of the year and 1st of her career.

External links
 WTA tournament edition details
 ITF tournament edition details

Bol Ladies Open

Bol Ladies Open
Croatian Bol Ladies Open
1991 in Croatian tennis